The National Alliance to End Homelessness is a United States-based organization addressing the issue of homelessness. The Alliance provides data and research to policymakers and elected officials in order to inform policy debates. They also work on the local level provide community partners with information on best practices and technical assistance.

History
In 1983, the National Citizens Committee for Food and Shelter was established to meet the emergency needs of the homeless population. In 1987, the Committee determined that a more comprehensive approach was necessary and created the National Alliance to End Homelessness. In May of 2022, Ann Oliva was named the new President and CEO of the organization, taking over for the previous CEO, Nan Ronan.

External links
National Alliance to End Homelessness Official site.

Citations

References 
The New York Times, July 17, 2006 – "Bloomberg Unveils Plan to Reduce Homelessness"

Plan du site The McKinney-Vento Homeless Assistance Act As amended by S. 896 The Homeless Emergency Assistance and Rapid Transition to Housing (HEARTH) Act of 2009
A Plan: Not A Dream How to End Homelessness in Ten Years Executive Summary PDF | 24 pages National Alliance to End Homelessness

Further reading 
 Colangelo, E. (2004). National alliance to end homelessness. In D. Levinson (Ed.), Encyclopedia of homelessness (Vol. 1, pp. 406-406). SAGE Publications, Inc., https://dx.doi.org/10.4135/9781412952569.n114

Homelessness organizations
Political advocacy groups in the United States
Homelessness in the United States
Organizations established in 1987
1987 establishments in the United States